Mendon is a town in Rutland County, Vermont, United States. The population was 1,149 at the 2020 census.

History
In February 1781, the town chartered under the name "Medway." The town name changed "Parkerstown" after it annexed a tract of land in November 1804. Finally, the town was renamed to "Mendon" in November 1828.

Mendon was one of thirteen Vermont towns isolated by flooding caused by Hurricane Irene in 2011.

Geography

Aitken State Forest is located in Mendon. The Appalachian Trail/Long Trail crosses the southeast corner of the town, passing near the summit of Killington Peak.

Demographics

As of the census of 2000, there were 1,028 people, 410 households, and 296 families residing in the town.  The population density was 27.0 people per square mile (10.4/km2).  There were 616 housing units at an average density of 16.2 per square mile (6.2/km2).  The racial makeup of the town was 98.25% White, 0.78% Asian, and 0.97% from two or more races. Hispanic or Latino of any race were 0.19% of the population.

There were 410 households, out of which 31.2% had children under the age of 18 living with them, 62.2% were married couples living together, 7.3% had a female householder with no husband present, and 27.6% were non-families. 19.0% of all households were made up of individuals, and 6.1% had someone living alone who was 65 years of age or older.  The average household size was 2.49 and the average family size was 2.83.

In the town, the population was spread out, with 23.2% under the age of 18, 5.5% from 18 to 24, 28.7% from 25 to 44, 28.8% from 45 to 64, and 13.7% who were 65 years of age or older.  The median age was 42 years. For every 100 females, there were 106.8 males.  For every 100 females age 18 and over, there were 111.0 males.

The median income for a household in the town was $53,125, and the median income for a family was $61,250. Males had a median income of $39,375 versus $30,592 for females. The per capita income for the town was $26,206.  About 2.3% of families and 4.7% of the population were below the poverty line, including 5.6% of those under age 18 and none of those age 65 or over.

Notable people
 Edward H. Ripley, Brevet Brigadier General in the Union Army during the American Civil War
 John E. Woodward, U.S. Army brigadier general during World War I

References

External links 

 Town of Mendon Official website

 
Towns in Vermont
Towns in Rutland County, Vermont